Bablomekang is an island in the Rock Islands of Palau.
It was last inhabited 2004, when inhabitants decided to move due to floodings.

References

Uninhabited islands of Palau
Koror